An import quota is a type of trade restriction that sets a physical limit on the quantity of a good that can be imported into a country in a given period of time.
Quotas, like other trade restrictions, are typically used to benefit the producers of a good in that economy (protectionism).

Quota share
The quota share is a specified number or percentage of the allotment as a whole quota, that is prescribed to each individual entity.

For example, the United States imposes an import quota on cars from Japan. The Japanese government may see fit to impose a quota share program to determine the number of cars each Japanese car manufacturer may export to the United States. Any extra number that a manufacturer wishes to export must be negotiated with another manufacturer that did not or cannot maximize its share of the quota.

There are also quota share insurance programs, where the liability and the premiums are divided proportionally among the insurers. For example, three companies take out a $1,000,000 fire insurance policy on a quota share basis with company A assuming 50% ($500,000), company B 30% ($300,000), and company C 20% ($200,000). If the annual premium was $5,000, company A would receive $2,500 in premium, B would receive $1,500, and C would receive $1,000.  Company A would pay 50% of any one claim, Company B would pay 30% of any one claim, and Company C would pay 20% of any one claim.

See also

 Non-tariff barriers to trade
 Production quota
 Tariff-rate quota

References

Quotas
Non-tariff barriers to trade
Import